Jay Smith may refer to:
Jay Smith (basketball) (born 1961), American basketball coach
Jay Smith (footballer, born September 1981), English football player for Southend and Notts County 
Jay Smith (footballer, born December 1981), English football player for Brentford
Jay R. Smith (1915–2002), American child actor
J. R. Smith (born 1985), American basketball player
Jay C. Smith (1929–2009), former principal accused of murder
Jay "Saint" Smith, American songwriter
Jay Smith (Christian apologist) (born 1954), American Christian apologist
Jay Smith, member of the band Sinch
Jay Smith (singer) (born 1981), Swedish singer and winner of Swedish Idol in 2010

See also
J. Smith (disambiguation)
James Smith (disambiguation)
Jason Smith (disambiguation)